The 2019 Southern Arkansas Muleriders football team represented Southern Arkansas University as a member of the Great American Conference (GAC) during the 2019 NCAA Division II football season. Led by 11th-year head coach Bill Keopple, the Muleriders played their home games at Rip Powell Field at Wilkins Stadium in Magnolia, Arkansas.

Previous season
The Muleriders finished the 2018 season at 8–4 overall and 8–3 in GAC play.

Offseason

Position key

Returning starters

Offense

Defense

Special teams

Coaching staff

Schedule

References

Southern Arkansas
Southern Arkansas Muleriders football seasons
Southern Arkansas Muleriders football